Turlough Hill, also known as Tomaneena, is a  mountain in County Wicklow in Ireland and site of Ireland's only pumped-storage hydroelectricity plant.

The mountain

The historian Liam Price recorded that the mountain was known locally as Tomaneena; Turlough Hill is the name given to it by the ESB when they surveyed the site for the pumped-storage scheme. The summit is located to the south-west of the upper reservoir and is easily reached via the tarmac access road that begins at the top of the Wicklow Gap. It is also possible to reach the summit from Glendalough or from the summits of neighbouring Camaderry and Conavalla mountains.

The underlying geology of the mountain is granite, covered with blanket bog, which is a habitat for heather, purple moor grass and  moss. A number of alpine plants grow near the summit: dwarf willow, cowberry, crowberry, fir clubmoss and common bilberry. To the north-east of the summit, at the head of Glendasan valley, is Lough Nahanagan, a corrie lake carved by a glacier at the end of the last ice age.

The pumped-storage scheme

The Turlough Hill Power Station is owned and operated by the Electricity Supply Board (ESB). Construction commenced in 1968, and the station became fully operational in 1974.

Name 
Whilst the original name is Tomaneena, renaming it ‘Turlough Hill’ has a certain validity. The pumped storage station draws water from the mountain top lake, which thus becomes a ‘dry lake’. There is a geological feature known as a Turlough; it is defined as "(in Ireland) a low-lying area on limestone which becomes flooded in wet weather through the welling up of groundwater from the rock.
Origin late 17th cent.: from Irish turloch, from tur ‘dry’ + loch ‘lake’."

References

Bibliography

External links

Turlough Hill at ESB
Tomaneena on Mountain Views

Mountains and hills of County Wicklow
Mountains under 1000 metres